The 1984 United States presidential election in Arizona took place on November 6, 1984. All fifty states and the District of Columbia, were part of the 1984 United States presidential election. State voters chose seven electors to the Electoral College, which selected the President and Vice President of the United States. Arizona was won by incumbent United States President Ronald Reagan of California, who was running against former Vice President Walter Mondale of Minnesota. Reagan ran for a second time with incumbent Vice President and former C.I.A. Director George H. W. Bush of Texas, and Mondale ran with Representative Geraldine Ferraro of New York, the first major female candidate for the vice presidency.

The presidential election of 1984 was a very partisan election for Arizona, with just under 99% of the electorate voting for either the Democratic or Republican parties, and only four parties appearing on the ballot. Nearly every county in Arizona voted with majorities for Reagan, a particularly strong turnout even in this typically conservative-leaning state. Reagan's win in the Grand Canyon state was largely the result of a lopsided 45% victory margin in Maricopa County, the state's most populated county and home to Phoenix. Mondale did best in predominantly Native American Apache County, which was typical of his gains vis-à-vis Jimmy Carter in Native American counties throughout the nation; Reagan thus became the first-ever Republican to win the White House without carrying this county. Mondale also won heavily unionized copper-mining Greenlee County; albeit his performance there was the worst by a Democrat since statehood.

Arizona weighed in for this election as sixteen points more Republican than the national average. Reagan won the election in Arizona with a decisive 34-point landslide. The wide margins found in Arizona, though generally conservative in its voting, are reflective of a nationwide reconsolidation of base for the Republican Party which took place through the 1980s; called by Reagan the "second American Revolution". This was most evident during the 1984 presidential election. No Republican candidate has received as strong of support in the American West at large, as Reagan did.

It is speculated that Mondale lost support with voters nearly immediately during the campaign, namely during his acceptance speech at the 1984 Democratic National Convention. There he stated that he intended to increase taxes. To quote Mondale, "By the end of my first term, I will reduce the Reagan budget deficit by two thirds. Let's tell the truth. It must be done, it must be done. Mr. Reagan will raise taxes, and so will I. He won't tell you. I just did."  Despite this claimed attempt at establishing truthfulness with the electorate, this claim to raise taxes badly eroded his chances in what had already begun as an uphill battle against the charismatic Ronald Reagan. Reagan also enjoyed high levels of bipartisan support during the 1984 presidential election, both in Arizona, and across the nation at large. Many registered Democrats who voted for Reagan (Reagan Democrats) stated that they had chosen to do so because they associated him with the economic recovery, because of his strong stance on national security issues with Russia, and because they considered the Democrats as "supporting American poor and minorities at the expense of the middle class."  These public opinion factors contributed to Reagan's 1984 landslide victory, in Arizona and elsewhere.

Results

Results by county

See also
 Presidency of Ronald Reagan

References

Arizona
1984
1984 Arizona elections